Alla Lyshafay is an international football defender currently playing for Zorky Krasnogorsk in the Russian league. She previously played for Lehenda Chernihiv, Gömrükçü Baku and Zvezda Perm, with whom she played the 2008-09 UEFA Women's Cup final.

As a member of the Ukraine national team she played the 2009 UEFA Women's Euro. She scored against Slovenia in the qualifying play-offs.

Honours
Lehenda Chernihiv
 Ukrainian Women's League (1) 2010,
 Women's Cup (1) 2010

Zvezda Perm
Russian Women's Leagues (1) 2007
Russian Women's Cup (1) 2007

Zorky Krasnogorsk 
Russian Women's Leagues champion: 2012–13
Russian Cup runners-up: 2012
Russian First Division champions: 2011

Ryazan
 Russian Women's Leagues (1) 2013 
 Russian Women's Cup (1) 2014

References

1983 births
Living people
Footballers from Chernihiv
Ukrainian women's footballers
WFC Lehenda-ShVSM Chernihiv players
Expatriate women's footballers in Russia
Zvezda 2005 Perm players
FC Zorky Krasnogorsk (women) players
Ukraine women's international footballers
Women's association football defenders
Ukrainian expatriate sportspeople in Russia
Ukrainian expatriate sportspeople in Azerbaijan